Badal is a village situated in the Lambi tehsil of the Sri Muktsar Sahib district in Punjab, India. The village is famous for its political affiliations and is always a hotspot of many prominent Indian Political Parties. The main leaders of Shiromani Akali Aal (SAD) party namely Parkash Singh Badal (Former CM, Punjab), Sukhbir Singh Badal (Former Deputy CM, Punjab) and Harsimrat Kaur Badal (Union Cabinet Minister) belong to Village Badal. Also prominent leader of People's Party of Punjab (PPP)/ Congress Manpreet Singh Badal (Finance Minister, Punjab) belong to Village Badal. Village Badal is a multi-cultural village living in harmony with four Gurdwara, two Hindu Temples and one Mosque. Village Badal also boasts two gyms and four sports stadiums for regular sports activity.

Geography
Village Badal is situated at 59 km South from Sri Muktsar Sahib (District Headquarters), 8 km from Lambi (Sub-division/Tehsil headquarters) and 265 km from Chandigarh (State Capital). It is also 16 km from nearest city gidderbaha & 33 km from Bathinda City and 17 km from Mandi Dabwali, Haryana, India. Village Badal lies mere 17 km North of border with Haryana State of India and 25 km East of Rajasthan State of India.

Demographics
According to the 2011 Census of India, Badal had 686 households comprising a population of 3473, of which 1863 were males and 1610 were females. There were 412 children aged 0–6 and the Average Sex Ratio was 864. The literacy rate was 67.49%, with male literacy standing at 74.52% and that for females being literacy rate was 59.26%.

Healthcare and Old Age Home

Government Hospital 
Village Badal have a well equipped and well staffed Government Hospital with 24/7 Emergency Service and Ambulance availability. The OPD department have well experienced and equipped doctors capable of diagnosing every kind of disease and treatment.

Baba Hira Das Ji Ayurvedic Hospital 
Baba Hira Das Ji Ayurvedic Hospital provides diagnosing and treatment with Ayurvedic Medicines and have IPD department for serious cases.

Old-Age Home 
Badal Village have an old-age home for needy senior citizens with 24/7 healthcare/ambulance service. The old age home have well behaving and well equipped residential rooms form senior citizens with regular monitoring of their food and heath.

Education

Colleges
State Institute of Nursing and Paramedical Sciences

Baba Hira Das Ji Ayurvedic Medical College and Hospital
Dasmesh Girls College
Dasmesh Girls College of Education

Schools
Government Senior Secondary School, Badal
2 Government Primary Schools, Badal
Mata Jaswant Kaur Memorial School, Badal (Only Boys)
Dasmesh Girls Senior Secondary School, Badal (Only Girls (Boys up to 5th standard)

Other Education Institutes
Sports Authority of India (SAI) Training Centre, Badal
Punjab Sports Department, Badal
Industrial Training Institutes (ITI) or Rural Institute for Vocational Training, Badal

Shooting Range, Badal

Stadiums
Guru Gobind Singh Multipurpose Sports Stadium, Badal

Guru Nanak Hockey Stadium, Badal
3 Unnamed Stadiums belonging to different organisations

References

Villages in Sri Muktsar Sahib district